Tej Singh or Raja Teja Singh was a Sikh commander in the Sikh Empire. He was appointed as Commander in chief of the Sikh  Khalsa Army during the First Anglo-Sikh War.

After the death of Maharaja Ranjit Singh, the Sikh court became fractious and the various agents acted at cross purposes to each other. Tej Singh appears to have had loyalties to the Raja Gulab Singh of Jammu and he, along with Gulab Singh, believed it to be a mistake to be warring with the British. However, Rani Jindan, the Regent acting on behalf of the anointed prince Duleep Singh, ordered him to march the troops against the British. He did so reluctantly.

In the Battle of Sobraon, General Tej Singh crossed a pontoon bridge on the Sutlej river and ordered its destruction. According to historian Amar Pal Sidhu, this incident led to the defeat of the Sikh Army, possibly as intended by Tej Singh.

After the defeat of Sikhs, the Treaty of Lahore was signed by which Kashmir was sold to Gulab Singh to pay war indemnities to the British as well as the army was regulated.

Gallery

References

External links 

People of the First Anglo-Sikh War
Sikh Empire